Yanam Beach is situated on the coast of Yanam town, an Indian territory of Puducherry. The beach is located on the Godavari River,  from the Bay of Bengal.

See also 
List of beaches in India

References 

Beaches of Puducherry
Yanam district